Tobacco smoking has serious negative effects on the body. A wide variety of diseases and medical phenomena affect the sexes differently, and the same holds true for the effects of tobacco. Since the proliferation of tobacco, many cultures have viewed smoking as a masculine vice, and as such the majority of research into the specific differences between men and women with regards to the effects of tobacco have only been studied in-depth in recent years.

Countries and regions

Egypt

Gaza

Religious bans on female smoking 
In 2010 the Hamas-led Islamist government of Gaza imposed a ban on women smoking the popular nargilas in public.  A spokesman for the Interior Ministry explained that "It is inappropriate for a woman to sit cross-legged and smoke in public. It harms the image of our people."  The ban was soon lifted later that year and women returned to smoking in popular venues like the cafe of Gaza's Crazy Water Park. The park was burned down by masked men in September 2010, after being closed by the Hamas. The Committee for the Propagation of Virtue and the Prevention of Vice (Gaza Strip) has arrested women for smoking in public.

Japan 

In Edo period or earlier than it, tobacco had come to Japan.  were the main smokers among Japanese women by the early 19th century.

North Korea

Syria

United States 

The cigarette industry began a propaganda campaign geared toward women beginning in the 1920s in the United States. These campaigns became more aggressive as time has progressed and marketing in general became more prominent. The practice of marketing aimed exclusively at women has continued into the present day and has now expanded globally.

With gender-targeted marketing, including packaging and slogans (especially "slimmer" and "lighter" cigarettes), and promotion of women smoking in movies and popular TV shows, the tobacco industry was able to increase the percent of women smoking. In the 1980s, tobacco industries were made to have the surgeon general's warning printed on each packaging of the tobacco products. This slowed the rate of women smoking but later it slightly increased after the advertisements started to look more present day and have more appealing packaging, that appealed to the younger generation. In more recent times, cigarette smoking has been banned from public places and this has decreased smoking rates in the United States.

Pre-1920s 
In January 1908, the New York City Board of Aldermen unanimously passed the Sullivan Ordinance; it prohibited smoking by women in public places. The mayor at the time, George B. McClellan Jr., vetoed the ordinance in February. There were many other such laws and rules. In 1911, the Sherman Anti-Trust Act divided the American Tobacco Trust into several different companies, making market share critical to each company's survival. The resulting competition spurred innovations in both product and marketing, and eventually progressed to the idea of brands. By 1915, Reynolds' Camel had become the first truly national brand. Soon to follow were Liggett & Myers' Chesterfield and the American Tobacco Company's Lucky Strike. These brands were modern and appealed to the modern sensibilities that were taking over the people of the United States at the time.

1920s–1940s 
In the early part of the 20th century, the anti-tobacco movement was aimed primarily at women and children. Smoking was considered a dirty habit and smoking by women was seriously frowned upon by society.  As the century progressed so did women's desire for equality.  The suffrage movement gave many women a sense of entitlement and freedom and the tobacco industry took advantage of the marketing opportunity. "Torches of Freedom" was a phrase used to encourage women's smoking by exploiting women's aspirations for a better life during the early twentieth century first-wave feminism in the United States. The term was first used by psychoanalyst A. A. Brill when describing the natural desire for women to smoke and was used by Edward Bernays to encourage women to smoke in public despite social taboos. Cigarettes were described as symbols of emancipation and equality with men.

Tobacco companies began marketing cigarettes to appeal to women during the burgeoning women's movement of the 1920s. The American Tobacco Company began targeting women with its ads for Lucky Strikes. They employed ads featuring prominent women, such as Amelia Earhart, and promised slimming effects. Most of the ads also conveyed a carefree and confident image of women that would appeal to the modern woman of the 1920s. The ads grew more extravagant with paid celebrity testimonials and far-reaching claims of how Lucky Strikes could improve their lives. Their most aggressive campaign directly challenged the candy industry by urging women to "reach for a Lucky instead of a sweet". These aggressive campaigns paid off, making Lucky Strike the most smoked brand within a decade.
 
Other companies followed the successful ad campaigns of the American Tobacco Company with their own versions. The Phillip Morris Company introduced Marlboro cigarettes in 1925.  Marlboros were advertised as being as "mild as May" and featured elegant ivory tips that appealed to women.  Other brands offered similar ads appealing to a woman's sense of beauty and style and made cigarettes an alluring part of many women's lives. Fear of weight gain remains a chief reason women continue to smoke. The ad campaigns successfully promoted cigarettes as a product possessing specific qualities including equality, autonomy, glamour, and beauty.

In 1929 Edward Bernays decided to pay women to smoke their "torches of freedom" as they walked in the Easter Sunday Parade in New York. This was a shock because until that time, women were only permitted to smoke in certain places such as in the privacy of their own homes. He was very careful when picking women to march because, "while they should be good looking, they should not look too model-y", and he hired his own photographers to make sure that good pictures were taken and then published around the world. Ruth Hale called for women to join in the march saying, "Women! Light another torch of freedom! Fight another sex taboo!" Once the footage was released, the women's walk was seen as a protest for equality and sparked discussion throughout the nation. The targeting of women in tobacco advertising led to higher rates of smoking among women. In 1923 women only purchased 5% of cigarettes sold; in 1929 that percentage increased to 12%, in 1935 to 18.1%, peaking in 1965 at 33.3%, and remaining at this level until 1977.

In 1934, Edward Bernays was asked to deal with women's apparent reluctance to buy Lucky Strikes because their green and red package clashed with standard female fashions. When Bernays suggested changing the package to a neutral color,  George Washington Hill, head of the American Tobacco Company, refused, saying that he had already spent millions advertising the package. Bernays then endeavored to make green a fashionable color. The centerpiece of his efforts was the Green Ball, a social event at the Waldorf Astoria, hosted by Narcissa Cox Vanderlip. The pretext for the ball and its unnamed underwriter was that proceeds would go to charity. Famous society women would attend wearing green dresses. Manufacturers and retailers of clothing and accessories were advised of the excitement growing around the color green. Intellectuals were enlisted to give highbrow talks on the theme of green. Before the ball had actually taken place, newspapers and magazines (encouraged in various ways by Bernays's office) had latched on to the idea that green was all the rage.

In a content analysis of North American and British editions of Vogue, Cheryl Krasnick Warsh and Penny Tinkler trace representations of women smokers from the 1920s through the 1960s, concluding that the magazine "located the cigarette within the culture of the feminine elite," associating it with "the constellation of behaviours and appearances presented as desirable characteristics of elitism, through the themes of lifestyle, 'the look', and feminine confidence".

1950s–1970s 
The late 1950s and early 1960s brought about a new onslaught of cigarette brands. Each new brand of cigarette introduced during this time advertised its unique benefits.  The major new innovation in tobacco marketing was the filtered cigarette.  Filters made cigarettes less harsh to smoke and offered the appearance of removing potentially harmful particles.  The 1950s began the rebranding of Marlboros from an elite cigarette to an everyman's cigarette and also saw the introduction of strong Marlboro men, such as athletes, and more famously cowboys.  This change in Marlboro branding meant Philip Morris was lacking a cigarette aimed at women.
 
The 1950s also began a boom in advertising for tobacco companies.  Ads featuring prominent movie and television stars became commonplace and tobacco companies also began sponsoring television shows, game shows, and other widespread media.  One of the most popular was Philip Morris's sponsorship of the I Love Lucy show.  The opener featured the two stars of the show with a giant pack of Philip Morris cigarettes.  The show Your Hit Parade was proudly sponsored by American Tobacco's Lucky Strike brand.
 
In 1965, it was reported that 33.9% of women were smoking.  Virginia Slims came on the market in 1968, and used the catch phrase "You’ve come a long way baby." This was the first cigarette to be marketed solely as a woman's cigarette.  The cigarettes were longer, slimmer, and overall more elegant and feminine.  The ads depicted photos of glamorous women set against photos of women doing mundane tasks such as laundry or housework.  1970 saw the release of Liggett & Myers Tobacco Company's entry into women specific cigarettes, Eve.  Eve cigarettes were decidedly more feminine than Virginia Slims.  Eve featured flowers or other feminine motifs on both the packaging and the cigarette themselves.
 
The 1970s ushered in the end of television advertising and the beginning of print ads carrying health warnings regarding the dangers of smoking.  The 1970s also brought nearly annual reports from the Surgeon General's office regarding the health consequences of smoking.  In 1970, a reported 31.5% of women were smokers.  Tobacco companies were barred from advertising on television, but smartly moved the market focus to sponsoring sporting and entertainment events.  In 1973, a widely publicized tennis match dubbed "The Battle of the Sexes" featured Billie Jean King, a long-time spokesperson for Virginia Slims, bedecked in the brand's sequins and colors.  American was tennis wild in the 1970s and Billie Jean King was a superstar.  Virginia Slims sponsored the Women's Tennis Association Tour for close to twenty years.  The 1970s ended with filtered cigarettes almost completely overtaking the market.

1980s-2010s 
The 1980s began with the first Surgeon General's Report on the Health Consequences of Smoking for Women.  This report—published nearly 15 years after the original 1964 Surgeon General's Report—came nearly sixty years after tobacco companies began marketing their products to women.  The smoking rate of women in 1980 was at 29.3%.  In 1987, Brown & Williamson introduced the Capri cigarette, which following suit with other feminine cigarettes was a long, slim, elegant cigarette geared toward feminine hands.
 
1990 saw the women's smoking rate at 22.8%, continuing its slow decline.   The Virginia Slims tennis tour came to an end in 1994, after 23 successful years.  This was just one of many broad spectrum advertising methods that ended in the 1980s and 1990s as public sentiments regarding smoking began their shift.  The 1990s were marked by continued restrictions on smoking in public and workplaces.  The late 1980s and 1990s were also marked by increased marketing to teenagers and young adults.  Many of the same marketing strategies used with women were used with this target group.  By 1998, the women's smoking rate had dropped to 22%.  1998 also marked the year of the Master Settlement Agreement.
 
The beginning of the 21st century saw women smoking at a rate of 22.8%, which was a slight increase compared to the previous decade.  Advertising and marketing remained static after the 1998 Settlement Agreement.  Advertising campaigns looked to present more modern and cutting-edge packaging and language, appealing to a younger and hipper demographic.  In 2001, the most recent Surgeon General's Report in regards to women and smoking was released.  RJ Reynolds entered the women's market in 2007, with its Camel No. 9 cigarette.  The packaging is very contemporary in feel, and very feminine at the same time.  It features pink edging as a distinct contrast on the black packaging and the interior of the package is lined in pink foil.  The cigarettes are sold in light and menthol light varieties, with the latter featuring a teal highlight and foil, instead of the pink of the regular lights.  The first decade of this century has also been marked by mass smoking regulations.  A multitude of cities, municipalities, and states passed legislations prohibiting smoking in public places, such as bars, restaurants, and an assortment of other public venues.  This is a growing phenomenon, which aided in reducing smoking rates in the United States. The overall smoking rate in the United States dropped from approximately 46% in 1950 to approximately 21% in 2004.  Smoking rates continued to slowly decline throughout the 2000s and 2010s. By 2017 the percentage of current smokers had fallen to 14.0% and the proportion of ex-smokers increased, these rates remained at a stand-still throughout the end of the decade. Compared to their male peers women were significantly less likely smoke; while 15.3% of men still smoked, only 12.7% of women were current smokers.

2020s and onward

General health effects 

According to the Centers for Disease Control and Prevention, cigarette smoking is the leading cause of preventable death in the United States and produces substantial health-related economic costs to society. During the time between 1995 and 1999, smoking resulted in approximately 440,000 premature deaths per year and about $157 billion in "health-related economic losses".  Smoking has been known to increase to the risks of, and has been linked to, a plethora of adverse health effects. For instance, "Cigarette smoking accounts for about one-third of all cancers, including 90 percent of lung cancer cases. [Smoking also] causes lung diseases such as chronic bronchitis and emphysema, [and can] increase the risk of heart disease, including stroke, heart attack, vascular disease, and aneurysm."  According to the Surgeon General's Report of 2004, titled "The Health Consequences of Smoking", other consequences of smoking include increased risk of cataracts, lowered levels of antioxidants, especially vitamin C, heightened inflammation, and periodontitis.

Unique gender differences and health effects for women 

In the United States, although general rates of smoking are declining – "24.1% in 1998 to 20.6% in 2008", and there are higher rates among men – the gendered health consequences illustrate that women are at a greater disadvantage. "In 2008, smoking prevalence was higher among men (23%) than women (18.3%)"; however that gender gap appears to be narrowing. Prior to recent increasing smoking rates, women usually experienced different effects of smoking compared to men. For instance, a decrease in lifetime expectancy is greater for female smokers compared to male smokers. On average, while an adult male loses 13.2 years due to smoking, an adult female smoker loses 14.5 years of life. This decreased life expectancy for male smokers mirrors the gender differences in life expectancy overall. However, when it comes to smokers in particular, males tend to smoke more heavily than women do. Yet still women continue to show more deleterious results. 
 
As previously mentioned, smoking is attributable to the majority of lung cancer cases. Over the years lung cancer mortality has dramatically increased among women. "In 1987, lung cancer surpassed breast cancer to become the leading cause of cancer death among U.S. women." Smoking now accounts for 80% of lung cancer deaths among women. Although there has been a more pronounced campaign to raise funds for breast cancer research and a possible cure, more women are dying from lung cancer. Research also continues to question whether women tend to be more susceptible to lung cancer, regardless of similar exposure as their male counterparts. However, making a definitive answer has been difficult, and the issue remains controversial. Chronic obstructive pulmonary disease (COPD) is another major issue among women who  smoke. The risk of having COPD is increased with amount and duration and smoking accounts for 90 percent of COPD mortalities.
 
The effects of smoking on cardiovascular health also shows sex differences. Heart diseases continue to be the leading cause of death nationwide, and one of the risk factors is smoking. Unique to women, smoking lowers their estrogen and their high-density lipoproteins that prevent arteries from blockage. For many women the effects of smoking on the heart's health become obvious later on in life. Among current female smokers, "the chance of dying from heart disease or lung cancer exceeds the chance of dying from breast cancer from 40 on (and does so by at least a factor of 5 after age 55)." The habit becomes particularly crucial when women are also taking birth control because these two in concert increases, even more so, women's chances of having a stroke or a heart attack.      
 
When observing older women, those who smoke in their postmenopausal stages tend to have a lower bone density along with more hip fractures when compared to their non-smoker counterparts. For the younger cohort of women, during their reproductive stages, smoking affects their reproductive health as well as pregnancy outcomes. Research has revealed that smoking makes it more difficult for women to conceive and it can also result in infertility. Women who smoke while they are pregnant increase their chances of having an early delivery and low-birth weight babies. One of the many serious effects on the fetus itself is sudden infant death syndrome (SIDS). Studies have shown that "infants of mothers who smoke during and after pregnancy are 3 to 4 times more likely to die from sudden infant death syndrome (SIDS) than babies to non-smoking mothers". Smoking during pregnancy could also cause stillbirth, preterm birth, placental abruption.

The future: women, smoking, and globalization 

As smoking levels decline in the developed world they are increasing in the developing world.  The major cigarette manufacturers have more than tripled the number of cigarettes exported in the last 35 years.  Tobacco companies are using similar strategies to attract women in other countries that they used in the early days of attracting American women.  Offering appealing ads that depict cigarettes as modern, empowering, and liberating draws in women smokers who make every effort to be as western as possible.  The smoking bans occurring in the United States are happening around the globe.  In other countries (as in the United States), tobacco manufacturers circumvent advertising restrictions by sponsoring events, retail endorsements, and advertising in alternative markets such as satellite television channels.  These methods have proven quite successful for the tobacco industry.  Overwhelmingly, in the global market the trends point toward the market becoming increasingly female in the future.

Delving deeper: Women, smoking and globalization

When discussing smoking among women it is crucial to also take into account the fact that smoking, and tobacco use in general, is a global issue that is not confined to the borders of the Western world. The World Health Organization (WHO) notes the stark difference between women in various geographic locations as it states that "[a]bout 22 percent of women in developed countries and 9 percent of women in developing countries smoke tobacco". However, numerically the number of women could be more in developing countries.  
 
In his article, Fred C. Pampel looks into why these differences may exist and suggests reasons pertaining to gender equality, cigarette diffusion, economic factors and smoking policies. For women in countries where traditional gender roles have changed, it becomes more socially acceptable for women to initiate smoking.  However, this evidence should not hinder a deeper look into the smoking among women in developed countries. 
 
Though the rates of smoking among people in developed countries are on a slow decline, smoking rates among middle and low-income countries are increasing. This particularly affects women within developing regions because they are most at risk when male cigarette use is high. About 70% of tobacco users live in developing countries, and about half of the men in these countries are smokers. Although women are not mainly the ones to smoke, they are still exposed to environmental tobacco smoke (ETS). When among men who smoke, the risks of passive smoking increase for women whether they are at home or at work. Smoking and second-hand smoke not only affects the female body but has detrimental results on the health of their children. This issue is compounded in developing nations that may already have limited medical care for women. 
 
A study that focused on pregnant women in a few Latin American and African countries, India and Pakistan showed that "[w]omen in Latin America had the highest level of tobacco use." The probability of living with a tobacco user was also high in Latin America but highest in Asia. Argentina and Uruguay had the highest percentages of women who were once regular smokers, who had smoked during their current pregnancy and who thought it was acceptable for women to smoke. 
One-fifth of the world's largest tobacco producers are in the Latin American region, which includes Argentina and Brazil. With such increased production in these countries, the prices of cigarettes are significantly lowered. In these two latter countries, a pack of premium cigarettes such as the Marlboro brand can cost between US$1 and US$1.99, rendering cigarettes more accessible and encouraging more consumption. This has serious implications for the population as whole. The smoking rates among women alone are also a point of concern. In Argentina, 22.6% of the women smoke, while in other countries such as Uruguay the percentage is 25.1 percent.      
 
As the rate of tobacco use among men is predicted to decrease, the rate among women is estimated to rise to 20% of the woman population by 2025. A major catalyst for this increase in smoking among women is globalization because it allows for the increase in the marketing of tobacco products to middle and low-income areas. In their efforts to expand their markets, multinational tobacco companies are paying particular attention to women. The advertisements tend to include words such as 'menthol', 'mild' and 'light,' and seek out women through "alluring marketing campaigns, linking smoking with emancipation and glamour". Consequently, the rates of tobacco use among women in regions such as Asia, Africa and Latin America have increased. The lack of strict tobacco control policies in developing countries sets up an environment where little to no advertising restrictions and taxation are in place to buffer the impending increase in smoking among women. What puts women in developing regions at an even greater disadvantage is the significant shift in tobacco production to their areas, where they are mainly involved in the harvesting.
 
With all these influences, cessation can be very difficult for women. There has been research surrounding this topic among many developed nations in order to explore and find the most successful methods, even for women. Many of these studies have expressed that women who attempt to quit on their own "were less likely to quit initially or to remain abstinent at follow up". When speaking of women in developing countries, however, they would experience added barriers due to their low-income status. While women in the developed countries have cessation programs available, not many programs are available to women in developing countries. The latter group of women could significantly benefit from educational programs that teach of the adverse effects of smoking on their health as well as the health of their children. Although these programs may not be set in place in the various areas they are most needed, several organizations have made an effort to draw smoking among women to the public's attention. For instance, the World Health Organization (WHO) published The Tobacco Atlas which is helpful in showing the scope of the issue among women on a worldwide scale. This organization has also negotiated the Framework Convention on Tobacco Control which is a treaty supported by 164 Parties and was done "in response to the globalization of the tobacco epidemic". This initiative has been particular about pointing out how women are also being affected. In sum, when looking at smoking among women beyond the boundaries of the Western world, the full scope of the issue comes into view.

See also
History of nicotine marketing
Nicotine marketing
Ovarian cancer

References

External links
 WHO - Gender, women, and the tobacco epidemic
 CDC - Women's Health - Topics A-Z - Smoking and Tobacco

Smoking
Women in society